Eurytela hiarbas, commonly known as the pied piper, is a butterfly of the family Nymphalidae, found in Sub-Saharan Africa.

Its wingspan is 45–50 mm in males and 48–55 mm in females. It has continuous broods, peaking between November and March.

Its larvae feed on Tragia glabrata, Dalechampia capensis, and Ricinus communis.

Subspecies
Listed alphabetically:
E. h. abyssinica Rothschild & Jordan, 1903 – Ethiopia
E. h. angustata Lathy, 1901 – Eswatini, South Africa: Limpopo, Mpumalanga, North West, Gauteng, KwaZulu-Natal, Eastern Cape and Western Cape
E. h. hiarbas (Drury, 1770) – Sierra Leone, Liberia, Ivory Coast, Ghana, Togo, Nigeria: south and the Cross River loop, Cameroon, Angola, Democratic Republic of the Congo, Uganda, western Tanzania
E. h. lita Rothschild & Jordan, 1903 – Kenya, Tanzania, Malawi, Zambia, Mozambique, eastern Zimbabwe

References

Butterflies described in 1770
Biblidinae
Taxa named by Dru Drury